Circumstantial evidence is a concept in law. 

Circumstantial Evidence may also refer to:

 Circumstantial Evidence (1929 film), a German silent crime film
 Circumstantial Evidence (1929 film), an American melodrama film
 Circumstantial Evidence (1935 film), an American film
 Circumstantial Evidence (1945 film), a 1945 American film noir
 Circumstantial Evidence (1952 film), a British film
 Circumstantial Evidence (album), a 1987 Shalamar album
 Alternative title for the 1941 detective novel James Tarrant, Adventurer by Freeman Wills Crofts